Lone may refer to:

People
Lone (given name), a given name (including a list of people with this name)
Lone (musician), Matt Cutler, an electronic musician from Nottingham, United Kingdom
Lone (surname), a surname (including a list of people with this surname)
Lone Fight (disambiguation), a family name

Places
Lone (river), a river of Baden-Württemberg, Germany
Lone Grove, Oklahoma
Lone Jack, Missouri
Lone Mountain (disambiguation)
Lone Oak (disambiguation), a number of places with the same name
Lone Peak
Lone Pine (disambiguation), a number of places with the same name
Lone Rock (disambiguation), a number of places with the same name
Lone Teepee
Lone Tree (disambiguation), a number of places with the same name

Art and entertainment
"Lone", a song by Tyler, the Creator from Wolf
Lone, a comic by Stuart Moore
Lone Sloane, a French comic character

Other uses
Loner, a person who avoids or does not actively seek human interaction
Lone (caste), a Kashmiri caste
Lone Guides (or Lones), Girl Guides or Girl Scouts who don't attend meetings
Lone Scouts, similar to Lone Guides
Lone pair, an unbonded electron pair

See also
Ione (disambiguation)
Loan
Lone Star (disambiguation)
Lone Wolf (disambiguation)
Lonely (disambiguation)